Iona Fyfe (born 16 January 1998) is a Scottish singer from Huntly, Aberdeenshire known for singing Scots folk songs and ballads. In 2016, she was a semi-finalist of the BBC Radio 2 Young Folk Award and, in 2017 and 2021, was a finalist of the BBC Radio Scotland Young Traditional Musician award. In 2018, she won "Scots Singer of the Year" at the MG ALBA Scots Trad Music Awards. In 2019, she won "Young Scots Speaker o the Year" at the inaugural Scots Language Awards, winning "Scots Performer o the Year" in the 2020 Awards, and "Scots Speaker o the Year" in the 2021 Awards. She has advocated for official recognition of the Scots language, successfully petitioning Spotify to add Scots to their list of languages.

Fyfe is a National Director of the Traditional Music and Song Association and serves as a committee member of the Musicians' Union Scotland.

Biography
Fyfe was born on 16 January 1998 and was raised in Huntly. She started learning poems in the Doric dialect of Scots as a child. She spent time in her youth in the company of bothy balladers such as Jock Duncan, Joe Aitken, and Geordie Murison, people that Fyfe considers to be her "adoptive family". After singing folk songs and bothy ballads, Fyfe auditioned to join the Royal Conservatoire of Scotland at the age of 16, being accepted. She graduated in 2019 with a First Class Honours degree in Traditional Music.

Fyfe is a communications officer of Scots language advocacy group Oor Vyce, and often speaks about getting Scots to be a "legal language". Her work in promoting the Scots language was recognised with awards from the Scots Language Awards in 2019, 2020 and 2021.

Music
Fyfe sings in English and Doric Scots, and translates English songs into Doric. She is a member of the Iona Fyfe Trio. Her music has been played on BBC Radio Scotland, BBC Radio 2, and BBC Radio nan Gàidheal. Her choice of country and western was inspired by Jane Turriff, who came from the north east of Scotland and recorded an album of country and western covers.

Her first solo album, Away From My Window, was recorded with various other artists, such as Tim Edey and Luc McNally.

In December 2020, Fyfe released her Scots translation of Christina Rossetti's Christmas song, In the Bleak Midwinter. After she was unable to choose Scots as the language for her song's metadata, she publicly asked music streaming service Spotify to add Scots to the languages available to describe uploaded songs. In March 2021, Spotify added Scots to their list of languages.

In 2016, Fyfe was a semi-finalist of the BBC Radio 2 Young Folk Award. In 2017 and 2021, she was a finalist of the BBC Radio Scotland Young Traditional Musician award. Also in 2017, she won the Molloy Award. In 2018, she won "Scots Singer of the Year" at the MG ALBA Scots Trad Music Awards.

In January 2021, Fyfe signed a petition opposing the UK government's plans to exclude professional musicians from their list of workers permitted to enter the EU without a visa, claiming the plans would make touring Europe "financially unviable".

In April 2021, Fyfe released a rendition of The Northern Lights, the unofficial anthem of Aberdeen F.C., after being commissioned by the club.

Discography
Fyfe has released two albums and two EPs of her songs.

2015: The First Sangs
2016: East EP
2018: Away From My Window (Cairnie Records)
2019: Dark Turn of Mind (Cairnie Records)

Awards
2017 - Molloy Award
2018 - Scots Singer of the Year - MG ALBA Scots Trad Music Awards
2019 - Young Scots Speaker o the Year - Scots Language Awards
2020 - Scots Performer o the Year - Scots Language Awards

External links
 
 Interview with Iona Fyfe
 The Northern Lights sang by Iona Fyfe

References

Scots-language culture
21st-century Scottish women singers
People from Huntly
People from Aberdeenshire
People associated with Aberdeenshire
1998 births
Scottish folk musicians
Scottish folk singers
Alumni of the Royal Conservatoire of Scotland
Living people
Scottish LGBT singers
Bisexual singers
Bisexual women